William Lindsay Cordiner (13 August 1908 – 9 October 1962) was a Scottish amateur football centre forward who played in the Scottish League for Queen's Park. He was capped by Scotland at amateur level.

References 

Association football forwards
Scottish footballers
Queen's Park F.C. players
Scottish Football League players
Scotland amateur international footballers
1962 deaths
1908 births
Footballers from Coatbridge